Aiken Regional Medical Centers is located in Aiken, South Carolina on University Parkway near the University of South Carolina Aiken.

Aiken Regional Medical Centers opened its doors in 1917 as the Aiken Hospital and Relief Society. Except for several years in the early 1920s, the hospital has provided quality healthcare to the residents of Aiken and surrounding communities. Today, it is a 273-bed acute care facility.

Services
Acute care and surgical hospital providing healthcare to the residents of Aiken and surrounding South Carolina communities. Specialized Cancer Care Institute of Carolina is located at Aiken Regional as well as a Women's LifeCare Center and the Aurora Pavilion for Behavioral Health Services.

Emergency medicine

The nurses, staff and board-certified emergency physicians treat approximately 48,000 patients a year. Aiken is part of the Door-to-Balloon Alliance (D2B), a national network of hospitals focused on reducing the "door-to-balloon" time between when a heart attack patient enters the hospital door to when the patient receives artery-clearing treatment.

Affiliation

Aiken Regional Medical Centers is owned and operated by Universal Health Services, Inc. (UHS), a King of Prussia, Pennsylvania-based company, which is one of the largest private healthcare management companies in the United States.

History
Aiken Regional Medical Centers opened its doors in 1917 as the Aiken Hospital and Relief Society. Except for several years in the early 1920s, the hospital has provided quality healthcare to the residents of Aiken and surrounding communities. Today, it is a 245-bed acute care facility. Aiken Regional Medical Centers also houses a 14-bed inpatient rehabilitation facility offering physical therapy, occupational therapy, and speech therapy.

Awards and accolades
 Received The Joint Commission's Gold Seal of Approval in 2012 and 2013
 Certificate from The SC Partnership for Health and The Carolinas Center for Medical Excellence for Reducing Hospital Readmissions by 20% for AMI
 Earned EPA's Energy STAR Certification for 2013 and 2014
 American Heart Association Gold Fit-friendly Worksite
 Aiken County Career and Technology Center Business Partner of the Year award
 Diabetes & Nutrition Teaching Center obtained reaccreditation by the American Diabetes Association-Diabetes Self-Management program

References

Hospitals in South Carolina
Buildings and structures in Aiken, South Carolina
1917 establishments in South Carolina
Hospitals established in 1917